Kingsman SC was a Canadian soccer club based in King, Ontario that played in the unsanctioned Canadian Soccer League.

History
The club was founded in 2016. They joined the Canadian Soccer League in 2019 with a team in the First Division as well as a team in the Reserve Division. They lost their inaugural match to FC Vorkuta 4-2. They finished their debut season in 8th place, clinching the final playoff spot.

Players

First Division roster

Seasons 
Men

References

Canadian Soccer League (1998–present) teams
Soccer clubs in Ontario